LDR may refer to:

Science, medicine and technology
 LDraw filename extension
 Low-dynamic-range rendering (LDR rendering) in 3D computer graphics, vs. high-dynamic-range rendering
 Light Dependent Resistor, or photoresistor
 Lateral digit reduction in birds; see Origin of birds#Digit homology
 A Local Democracy Reporter, working for the United Kingdom's Local Democracy Reporting Service

Other uses
 European Liberal Democrat and Reform Party (European Parliament group)
 Lana Del Rey, American singer-songwriter (born 1985)
 Long-distance relationship of a couple
 Luxembourg Depositary Receipt